The Courage to Care is a 1985 American short documentary film directed by Robert H. Gardner and produced by Carol Rittner about non-Jews who rescued Jews during the Holocaust. It was nominated for an Academy Award for Best Documentary (Short Subject). Rittner wrote a book of the same name as a companion volume to the film, which also includes the personal narratives of the same persons in the film and many others.

References

External links
 
 Watch The Courage to Care at Facing History and Ourselves

1985 films
1985 documentary films
1985 short films
1980s short documentary films
American short documentary films
American independent films
Documentary films about the Holocaust
1985 independent films
1980s English-language films
1980s American films